The 2017 Recharge With Milk Men's Tankard, better known as the Ontario Tankard was the 2017 edition of the Ontario men's provincial curling championship to determine who will represent the province of Ontario at the 2017 Tim Hortons Brier, the national curling championship of Canada. In 2017, the Tankard was contesteded in conjunction with the 2017 Ontario Scotties Tournament of Hearts, at the Cobourg Community Centre in Cobourg, Ontario, January 29-February 5, 2017.

Ten teams played a round robin competition, followed by a page playoff to determine the tournament champion.

A 54 year old Glenn Howard led his team to win his 17th career provincial championship, qualifying himself for a record 17th Brier.

Teams
The teams are as follows:

Round-robin standings

Round-robin results

Draw 1
Sunday, January 29, 7:00pm

Draw 2
Monday, January 30, 9:00am

Draw 3
Monday, January 30, 3:00pm

Draw 6
Tuesday, January 31, 2:30pm

Draw 7
Tuesday, January 31, 7:30pm

Draw 8
Wednesday, February 1, 9:30am

Draw 9
Wednesday, February 1, 2:30pm

Draw 10
Wednesday, February 1, 7:30pm

Draw 11
Thursday, February 2, 9:30am

Draw 12
Thursday, February 2, 2:30pm

Draw 13
Thursday, February 2, 7:30pm

Draw 14
Friday, February 3, 9:30am

Draw 16
Friday, February 3, 7:30pm

Tiebreaker 1
Saturday, February 4, 9:00am

Tie Breaker 2
Saturday, February 4, 2:00pm

Playoffs

1 vs. 2
Saturday, February 4, 2:00pm

3 vs. 4
Saturday, February 4, 7:00pm

Semifinal
Sunday, February 5, 9:00am

Final
Sunday, February 5, 4:00pm

Qualification Process
Qualifying for the men's Tankard has changed for 2017. Ten teams will qualify from two provincial qualifiers (three each) and a challenge round. The top two southern Ontario teams in the CTRS standings (as of December 4) will also qualify. The provincial qualifiers are preceded by four regional qualifiers in which at least three teams qualify for the provincial qualifiers, plus the teams ranked 3-10 on the CTRS standings

(Regional) Qualifiers

Qualifier #1
December 17–18, at the RCMP Curling Club, Ottawa

Teams entered:

Jamie Britwistle (Ottawa)
Kurtis Byrd (Cataraqui)
Bryan Cochrane (Russell)
Dave Collyer (Quinte)
Ritchie Gillan (Ottawa)
Francis Hawco (Rideau)
Jake Higgs (West Northumberland)
Bryan Lewis (Rideau)
Jason Reid (Rideau)
Spencer Richmond (Perth)

Brackets:

Qualifier #2
December 17, at the Oakville Curling Club, Oakville

Teams entered:

Rob Ainsley (Royal Canadian)
Mike Harris (Toronto Cricket)
Josh Johnston (Royal Canadian)
Codey Maus (Highland)
Patrick Morris (High Park)
Hugh Murphy (Mississaugua)
Rob Retchless (Royal Canadian)
Chris Van Huyse (Scarboro)

Brackets:

Qualifier #3
December 17–18, at the Barrie Curling Club, Barrie

Teams entered:

John Bolton (Lindsay)
Dave Coutanche (Richmond Hill)
Ian Dickie (York)
Connor Duhaime (Cookstown)
Brent Gray (Bayview)
Cory Heggestad (Stroud)
Richard Krell (Kitchener-Waterloo Granite)
Rob Lobel (Thornhill)
Gregory Park (Oshawa)
Brent Ross (Harriston)
Michael Shepherd (Richmond Hill)
Chris Wimmer (Stroud)

Brackets:

Qualifier #4
December 17–18, at the Chatham Granite Club, Chatham

Teams entered:

Scott Bailey (Dundas Granite)
Bill Buchanan (Welland)
Glenn Garneys (London)
Dale Kelly (Chatham Granite)
Rick Law (Kingsville)
Ryan LeDrew (Sarnia)
Drew Macklin (Burlington)
Nathan Martin (Oshawa)
Kirk Massey (Ilderton)
Daryl Shane (Kitchener-Waterloo Granite)
Jon St. Denis (Listowel)
Wayne Tuck Jr. (Brantford)

Brackets:

Provincial Qualifiers

Qualifier A
January 7–8, RCMP Curling Club, Ottawa

CTRS qualified teams:
Dayna Deruelle (Cataraqui) 
Colin Dow (RCMP)
Glenn Howard (St. George's)
Sebastien Robillard (Ottawa)

Brackets:

Qualifier B
January 7–8, Niagara Falls Curling Club, Niagara Falls

CTRS qualified teams:
Mark Bice (Sarnia)
Pat Ferris (Grimsby)
Chris Gardner (Loonie)
Ryan McCrady (Rideau)

Brackets:

Challenge round
January 20–22, Midland Curling Club, Midland

New teams: 
Mark McDonald (Cataraqui) 
Mark Kean (Leaside)

Brackets:

References

2017
2017 in Canadian curling
Cobourg
January 2017 sports events in Canada
February 2017 sports events in Canada
Tankard
2017 Tim Hortons Brier